The name Florence has been used for ten tropical cyclones in the Atlantic Ocean and five tropical cyclones in the Eastern Pacific Ocean.

Atlantic
Hurricane Florence (1953) – destroyed hundreds of homes in Florida, no deaths.
Tropical Storm Florence (1954) – killed 5 and caused $1.5 million in damage in Mexico.
Tropical Storm Florence (1960) – caused slight damage to Florida.
Tropical Storm Florence (1964) – passed west over the Azores while forming, went north, dissipated at sea.
Hurricane Florence (1988) – formed in western Gulf of Mexico, passed over New Orleans and Lake Pontchartrain.
Hurricane Florence (1994) – absorbed by a cold front without threatening land.
Hurricane Florence (2000) – meandered near Bermuda but caused no damage.
Hurricane Florence (2006) – struck Bermuda and later Newfoundland.
Tropical Storm Florence (2012) – formed near the Cape Verde Islands.
Hurricane Florence (2018) – peaked as a Category 4, killed 57 people and caused extensive damage in both North and South Carolina.

After the 2018 season, the World Meteorological Organization retired the name Florence from its rotating name lists, and it will not be used again for another Atlantic hurricane. It will be replaced with Francine for the 2024 season.

Pacific
Hurricane Florence (1963)
Tropical Storm Florence (1965)
Tropical Storm Florence (1969)
Hurricane Florence (1973)
Hurricane Florence (1977)

Atlantic hurricane set index articles
Pacific hurricane set index articles